For a number of years up until 2013, it was proposed that the Thane district be divided and a separate Jawhar District carved out of the existing Thane district with the inclusion of the northern tribal talukas of Thane district which include Palghar, Vada, Vikramgad, Jawhar, Mokhada, Dahanu and Talasari talukas in the proposed Jawhar district. The last Princely Ruler of Jawhar State at Indian independence was His Highness Maharaja Patangshah V (Yashwantrao Martandrao) Mukne. Jawhar was the cultural capital of this rural part of Thane District which was previously known as Jawhar State ruled by Kolis. However, in June 2014, the Maharashtra State government decided to add an eighth taluka Vasai, which was previously part of Thane district to the other seven talukas, and decided that the new District would be headquartered in Palghar.

References

Proposed districts in Maharashtra
Konkan division
Palghar district